Ain Yaaqoub   is a  village in Akkar Governorate, Lebanon.

The population of Ain Yaaqoub is mainly Greek Orthodox and Sunni Muslim.

History
In 1838, Eli Smith noted  the village as 'Ain Ya'kob,  whose inhabitants were Sunni Muslims and  Greek Orthodox, located east of esh-Sheikh Mohammed.

References

Bibliography

External links
Ain Yaaqoub, Localiban 

Populated places in Akkar District
Sunni Muslim communities in Lebanon
Eastern Orthodox Christian communities in Lebanon